Dactylomys is the genus of South American bamboo rats They are arboreal members of the family Echimyidae.

Systematics

The genus contains three species:
 Dactylomys boliviensis (Bolivian bamboo rat)
 Dactylomys dactylinus (Amazon bamboo rat)
 Dactylomys peruanus (Montane bamboo rat)

Phylogeny
Dactylomys is a member of the Echimyini clade of arboreal Echimyidae rodents. The closest relative of Dactylomys is Olallamys, and then Kannabateomys. These South American bamboo rats share unique features and are grouped under the informal clade name of "Dactylomyines". The dactylomyines are the sister genera to Diplomys and Santamartamys. All these taxa are closely related to the genera Echimys, Phyllomys, Makalata, Pattonomys, and Toromys. In turn, these genera share phylogenetic affinities with the clade containing Lonchothrix and Mesomys, and with Isothrix.

References

 
Taxa named by Isidore Geoffroy Saint-Hilaire
Rodent genera